Malina Nicole Pardo (born 29 June 2001) is a Puerto Rican footballer who plays as a midfielder or a forward for college team Charlotte 49ers and the Puerto Rico women's national team.

Early life
Pardo was born and raised in Raleigh, North Carolina.

High school and college career
Pardo has attended the Leesville Road High School in Raleigh, North Carolina and the University of North Carolina Wilmington in Wilmington, North Carolina.

International career
Pardo represented Puerto Rico at the 2020 CONCACAF Women's U-20 Championship. She made her senior debut on 18 February 2021 in a friendly away match against the Dominican Republic.

References

2001 births
Living people
Puerto Rican women's footballers
Women's association football midfielders
Women's association football forwards
Puerto Rico women's international footballers
Soccer players from Raleigh, North Carolina
Soccer players from North Carolina
American women's soccer players
UNC Wilmington Seahawks women's soccer players
American sportspeople of Puerto Rican descent
Charlotte 49ers women's soccer players